Club Deportivo Arguineguín is a football team based in Arguineguín, Canary Islands. Founded in 1968, the team plays in Preferente de Las Palmas.

The club's home ground is Estadio Municipal.

Season to season

10 seasons in Tercera División

External links
Official website
Preferente de Las Palmas

Football clubs in the Canary Islands
Sport in Gran Canaria
Association football clubs established in 1968
Divisiones Regionales de Fútbol clubs
1968 establishments in Spain